Nuber is a surname. Notable people with the surname include:

Hermann Nuber (1935–2022), German footballer
Larry Nuber (1948–2000), American auto racing announcer
Philip W. Nuber (1939–2003), American Air Force Major General and director of the Defense Mapping Agency